Rucha Hasabnis Jagdale (born 8 February 1988) is an Indian actress known for playing Rashi Shah Modi in Star Plus's famous soap opera Saath Nibhana Saathiya from 2010 to 2014 .Later Hasabnis took a break from acting to get married to businessmen Rahu Jagdale in 2015 and focus on her family. Rucha Hasabnis regained her popularity in 2020 during the COVID-19 lockdown as musician and YouTuber Yashraj Mukhate made a Rasode mein kaun tha rap from her famous dialogues as 'Rashiben' from Saath Nibhana Saathiya which also resulted in its re-run. On 10 December 2019 she gave birth to a girl, she named her daughter Ruhi and on 7 November 2022 she gave birth to a boy.she named  her son Ronit.

Career

In 2009, she began her acting career with the Marathi drama Chaar Choughi where she played the role of Devika.

Hasabnis' breakthrough role came in the drama series Saath Nibhaana Saathiya where she played the role of Rashi Modi from 2010 to 2014.

In 2021, in an interview with Times of India & Glitz Vision USA, Rucha announced she is ready to make comeback on TV and waiting for an amazing script.

Personal life
Hasabnis was born on 8 February 1988 in Mumbai, Maharashtra, India. On 26 January 2015, she married Rahul Jagdale and took break from acting afterwards. On 10 December 2019, she gave birth to a daughter. On 7 November 2022 she gave birth to a son.
 
In 2020, she's comeback with small screen shoot.

Television

See also
List of Hindi television actresses
List of Indian television actresses

References

External links

 
 

Actresses from Mumbai
Living people
1988 births
Indian television actresses
Indian soap opera actresses
21st-century Indian actresses